Fingleton is a surname. Notable people with the surname include:

Diane Fingleton, former Queensland Magistrates Court judge
Eamonn Fingleton (born 1948), Irish journalist and author
Jack Fingleton OBE (1908–1981), Australian cricketer, journalist and commentator
James Fingleton (1876–1920), member of the New South Wales Legislative Assembly
Michael Fingleton, former chief executive of Irish Nationwide Building Society
Neil Fingleton (1980–2017), English actor and former basketball player
Sean Fingleton (born 1950), Irish artist noted for Irish landscapes and seascapes
Tony Fingleton, Australian former swimmer

See also
Ingleton (disambiguation)